Aghcheh Masjed (also Romanized as Āghcheh Masjed) is a village in Keshavarz Rural District, Keshavarz District, Shahin Dezh County, West Azerbaijan Province, Iran. At the 2006 census, its population was 788, in 190 families.

References 

Populated places in Shahin Dezh County